Bi Ying (born 11 February 1970) is a Chinese former professional tennis player.

Bi played on the professional circuit in the 1990s and had a best singles ranking of 592, with the highlight a WTA Tour main draw appearance at the China Open in 1994. As a doubles player she had a career-high ranking of 202 and won three ITF titles. During her career, she represented China at both the Federation Cup and Asian Games.

All of Bi's four Federation Cup ties came in 1993, which included two in the World Group. In the World Group first round against Peru, she won in the singles against Pilar Vásquez, then partnered with Li Fang to win the deciding doubles rubber. Beaten by the United States in the second round, Bi lost in the singles to Lindsay Davenport in straight sets.

At the 1994 Asian Games in Hiroshima, Bi won a bronze medal as an unused substitute in the women's team event.

ITF finals

Doubles: 3 (3–0)

See also
List of China Fed Cup team representatives

References

External links
 
 
 

1970 births
Living people
Chinese female tennis players
20th-century Chinese women